MacIndoe v Mainzeal Group Ltd [1991] 3 NZLR 273 is a cited case in New Zealand regarding the legal enforceability of a contract  where there is a breach of a stipulation.

Background
MacIndoe purchased a stratum title in a property development from Mainzeal, with payments to be paid by instalments.

Clause 8 of the sale agreement made making time of the essence to pay the instalments.

MacIndoe was later late on paying an instalment, and as a result, Mainzeal cancelled the contract.

Held
Given that paying the instalment on time was an essential part of the contract, Mainzeal were entitled to treat the contract as being repudiated.

References

Court of Appeal of New Zealand cases
New Zealand contract case law
1991 in case law
1991 in New Zealand law